The women's 400 metres hurdles event at the 2007 Summer Universiade was held on 11–13 August.

Medalists

Results

Heats
Qualification: First 2 of each heat (Q) and the next 2 fastest (q) qualified for the final.

Final

References

Results

400
2007 in women's athletics
2007